The Slovenska Zamejska Skavtska Organizacija (Slovene Minority Scout Organization, SZSO) is a Catholic Scouting and Guiding association serving Slovenes in Friuli-Venezia Giulia, Italy. SZSO is affiliated to the Associazione Guide e Scouts Cattolici Italiani (AGESCI), the largest Scout association in the country.

SZSO is affiliated to the ZSKSS (Združenje slovenskih katoliških skavtinj in skavtov), Scout association in Slovenia also, having special agreement about mutual cooperation.

SZSO, whose first group was organized in 1951, was officially founded in 1976.

References

External links
Official website

Scouting and Guiding in Italy
Youth organizations established in 1976